Korsimoro is a department or commune of Sanmatenga Province in central Burkina Faso. Its capital is the town of Korsimoro.

Towns and villages

The department/community consists of the capital Korsimoro, divided into 6 Sectors, and 30 villages, including Baskoudré–Mossi, Baskoudré-Peulh, Dollé, Foulla, Ilartenga, Imiougou-Natenga, Ipalla, Kiendpalogo, Kirbaka, Mederin-Peulh, Nimpoui, Noungou, Ouidin, Ouitenga-Poecin, Sabouri-Nakoara, Sabouri-Natenga, Sabouri-Sonkin, Soubouri-Soukia, Tamboko, Tansablogo, Tansin, Taonsgo, Toulguéré-Peulh and Zourtenga.

On 11 June 2015, the neighborhood Tangporin of the capital was promoted to village level with the name Tengressene.

References

Departments of Burkina Faso
Sanmatenga Province